Dactylopodolidae is a family of worms belonging to the order Macrodasyida.

Genera:
 Dactylopodola Strand, 1929
 Dendrodasys Wilke, 1954
 Dendropodola Hummon, Todaro & Tongiorgi, 1993

References

Gastrotricha